Rebecca Louisa Ferguson Sundström (born 19 October 1983) is a Swedish actress. She began her acting career with the Swedish soap opera Nya tider (1999–2000) and went on to star in the slasher film Drowning Ghost (2004). She came to international prominence with her portrayal of Elizabeth Woodville in the British television miniseries The White Queen (2013), for which she was nominated for a Golden Globe for Best Actress in a Miniseries or Television Film.

Ferguson starred as MI6 agent Ilsa Faust in the action spy film Mission: Impossible – Rogue Nation (2015) and its sequel Mission: Impossible – Fallout (2018), both with Tom Cruise. She played Jenny Lind in the musical film The Greatest Showman (2017), starred in the horror films Life (2017) and  Doctor Sleep (2019), and had supporting parts in the comedy-drama Florence Foster Jenkins (2016), the mystery thriller The Girl on the Train (2016), and the science fiction films Men in Black: International (2019) and Dune (2021).

Early life 
Ferguson was born in Stockholm and grew up in the Vasastan district in central Stockholm. Her mother, Rosemary Ferguson, is English, and moved from Britain to Sweden at the age of 25. Her father is Swedish. Her maternal grandmother is Northern Irish, and her maternal grandfather is Scottish. Ferguson took her mother's surname as her stage name.

She attended an English-medium school in Sweden and was raised bilingual, speaking Swedish and English. Ferguson attended the Adolf Fredrik's Music School in Stockholm and graduated in 1999.

From the age of 13, she worked as a model and appeared in magazines and on television commercials for cosmetic, apparel, and jewellery advertisements. Ferguson has danced from a very early age; she danced ballet, tap-dancing, jazz, street funk and tango. She taught Argentine tango at a dance company in Lund, Sweden for a few years while she continued her work on several short art film projects. Unsure if she wanted to act, Ferguson had other jobs, such as working at a daycare centre, as a nanny, at a jewellery shop, at a shoe shop and at a Korean restaurant.

Career 

Ferguson came to prominence as upper-class girl Anna Gripenhielm in the Swedish soap opera Nya tider (1999–2000). She went on to later play Chrissy Eriksson in the Swedish-American soap Ocean Ave. (2002). Swedish director Richard Hobert spotted her at the Simrishamn town market in 2011, which led to her starring in his film A One-way Trip to Antibes. She appeared in the horror film Drowning Ghost (2004) and the 2013 film VI alongside Gustaf Skarsgård.

In August 2012, it was announced Ferguson had been cast to play Elizabeth Woodville in the ten-part BBC historical television drama The White Queen (2013), based on Philippa Gregory's The Cousins' War novels about the women of the Wars of the Roses. Ferguson's performance in The White Queen was met with critical praise, and earned her a Golden Globe Award nomination for Best Actress in a Miniseries or Television Film.

In 2015, Ferguson played Ilsa Faust, the female lead in the fifth Mission: Impossible film, Mission: Impossible – Rogue Nation, for which she received critical acclaim. Tom Cruise handpicked Ferguson to star opposite him in the film after watching her in The White Queen. She reprised her role in the sixth Mission: Impossible film, Mission: Impossible – Fallout, in 2018. It is Ferguson's biggest commercial success to date. She played the dual roles of Katya and Lauren in the Cold War espionage thriller directed by Shamim Sarif, Despite the Falling Snow (2016), opposite Sam Reid and Charles Dance. For her performance in the film, she won the Best Actress award at the 2016 Prague Independent Film Festival. Later that same year, Ferguson appeared in Stephen Frears's Florence Foster Jenkins alongside Meryl Streep, and Tate Taylor's thriller book adaptation The Girl on the Train.

In 2017, Ferguson played the female lead in Daniel Espinosa's sci-fi horror Life, opposite Jake Gyllenhaal and Ryan Reynolds, co-starred in Tomas Alfredson's crime thriller The Snowman, alongside Michael Fassbender and Charlotte Gainsbourg, and starred as Swedish opera singer Jenny Lind in the musical film The Greatest Showman, with Hugh Jackman and Michelle Williams. In 2018, during her appearance on The Graham Norton Show, Ferguson revealed that her mother had actually worked with ABBA. In 2019, Ferguson had several major film roles, including co-starring in Doctor Sleep, the adaptation of Stephen King's novel of the same name. She played Lady Jessica in Denis Villeneuve's adaptation of Dune, released in 2021.

Personal life 
In 2007, Ferguson gave birth to a son with her boyfriend Ludwig Hallberg. After her soap opera success and the birth of her son, she moved with her boyfriend to Simrishamn, on the Swedish southeast coast. The couple separated in April 2015.

Since 2016, Ferguson has been in a relationship with a man called Rory. In mid-2018, she gave birth to her daughter, fathered by Rory, whom she married at the turn of the year. They have a house in Richmond, southwest London, owing to its proximity to Pinewood and Shepperton studios.

Filmography

Awards and nominations

References

External links 

1983 births
Living people
Swedish film actresses
Actresses from Stockholm
Swedish people of Irish descent
Swedish people of Scottish descent
Swedish television actresses
Swedish soap opera actresses
Swedish female models
20th-century Swedish actresses
21st-century Swedish actresses
Swedish expatriates in England
Swedish people of English descent